Penium is a genus of green algae, and the sole member of the family Peniaceae. The genus contains about 39 species.

References

External links

Scientific references

Scientific databases

 
 AlgaTerra database
 Index Nominum Genericorum

Desmidiales
Charophyta genera